Tipha may refer to:
Siphae, a town of ancient Boeotia, Greece
Tisis, a genus of insects